Cryptopecten is a genus of molluscs in the family Pectinidae.

Selected species
 Cryptopecten phrygium (Dall, 1886) — spathate scallop

References

Pectinidae
Bivalve genera